The Waingongoro River is a river of the Taranaki Region of New Zealand's North Island. It flows initially southeast from the slopes of Taranaki/Mount Egmont and passes through the town of Eltham before veering southwest to meet the Tasman Sea five kilometres west of Hawera, at Ohawe Beach.

The Normanby Power Station is located on the Waingongoro River at Normanby Road.

See also
List of rivers of New Zealand

References

South Taranaki District
Rivers of Taranaki
Rivers of New Zealand